The Principe di Carignano class was a group of three ironclad warships built for the Italian Regia Marina (Royal Navy) in the 1860s. Originally ordered as wooden frigates, they were the first ironclads to be built in Italy, but the inexperience of the Italian shipyards and the redesign process produced lengthy construction times, such that only the lead ship was completed in time to see action during the Third Italian War of Independence in 1866.

Principe di Carignano took part in the Battle of Lissa on 20 July 1866, where she led the Italian line of battle, but was not heavily engaged. Rendered obsolescent by the advent of central battery and turret ships in the 1870s, the three Principe di Carignano-class ships did not have particularly long or active service lives. In an effort to reduce the maintenance budget to offset the cost of newer ships under construction, Principe di Carignano was stricken from the naval register in 1875; Messina and Conte Verde followed in 1880, the latter just nine years after completion.

Design
The first two vessels of the Principe di Carignano class were initially ordered as steam frigates by the Regia Marina Sarda (Royal Sardinian Navy) shortly before the unification of Italy. While they were on the stocks, the Regia Marina (Royal Navy) of the newly-formed Kingdom of Italy decided to convert the ships into ironclads. A third ship, was too far advanced in her construction to allow for conversion, and so she was completed as a wooden vessel. These ships had been designed by Inps. Eng. Felice Mattei. A fourth ship, Conte Verde, was built to a modified design created by Inps. Eng. Giuseppe De Luca. These ships came as part of a major naval expansion program that was designed to prepare a fleet of ironclads capable of defeating the Austrian Navy. Italy considered the Austrian Empire to be its main rival, since it controlled predominantly Italian areas, including Venice, that the newly unified kingdom sought to incorporate into the country.

General characteristics and machinery
The ships of the Principe di Carignano class varied slightly in their dimensions. At normal loading, she displaced , and she reached  with a full load. The ships had a crew of 572.

Their propulsion system consisted of one single-expansion marine steam engine that drove a single screw propeller, with steam supplied by six coal-fired, cylindrical fire-tube boilers. The boilers were trunked into a single funnel. To supplement her steam engine, the ship was barquentine-rigged with three masts.

Armament and armor
The Principe di Carignano-class ships were broadside ironclads; the lead ship was armed with a main battery of ten 72-pounder  guns and twelve  rifled muzzle-loading guns  Messina and Conte Verde instead carried four 8 in guns and eighteen 164 mm guns. The ships were equipped with a spur-shaped ram at the bow. In 1870, the ships' armament was revised; Principe di Carignano retained four of her 8 in guns, with the other four being replaced by 164 mm guns. Messina lost ten of her 164 mm guns and gained a pair of  guns, while Conte Verde was reequipped with six 10 in guns and one 8 in gun.

Unlike her two sisters, Conte Verde did not have complete iron armor on her sides. She instead had wrought iron armor that covered only parts of her bow and stern instead of the full armored belt fitted to her sisters. The rest of the ship received traditional timber armor.

Ships

Service history
Though the Principe di Carignanos were the second class of Italian ironclads, the foreign shipyards that built the subsequent  and es completed almost all of those vessels before the first member of the Principe di Carignano class entered service. Principe di Carignano was the only member of the class to enter service in time to take part in the Third Italian War of Independence against the Austrian Empire. The war broke out in June 1866, as Italy, which had allied with Prussia, sought to take advantage of the Austro-Prussian War to seize Austrian-controlled Venice. After initially remaining in port, the Italian fleet under Admiral Carlo Pellion di Persano launched an attack on the island of Lissa in mid-July; the Austrian fleet under Rear Admiral Wilhelm von Tegetthoff sortied to mount a counterattack, which resulted in the Battle of Lissa on 20 July. Principe di Carignano, the lead ship in the line of battle, was not heavily engaged, as Tegetthoff had attacked the Italian fleet at its center. Principe di Carignano tried to attack the wooden vessels of the Austrian fleet without success before Persano broke off the action; the Italian fleet had become disorganized and two ships,  and  had been sunk.

The three ships, which rapidly became obsolescent due to the development of central battery ironclads and later turret ships, saw very limited service in the 1870s. Principe di Carignano and Messina were modernized with new guns in 1870. Neither ship played a role in the attack on Civitavecchia that year—the last stage of the Italian wars of unification that resulted in the seizure of Rome—owing to the very poor state of the Regia Marina in the aftermath of Lissa. In 1875, Principe di Carignano was sold for scrap to reduce the maintenance budget in an attempt to offset part of the cost of the new  and s then under construction; Messina and Conte Verde followed in 1880, though the latter remained laid up until she too went to the breakers' yard in 1898.

Footnotes

Notes

Citations

References

External links
 Classe Principe di Carignano Marina Militare website